Mahendra Singh Solanki (born 11 April 1984) is an Indian parliament politician. He was elected to the Lok Sabha, lower house of the Parliament of India from Dewas, Madhya Pradesh in the 2019 Indian general election as member of the Bharatiya Janata Party.

Previously he has worked as a judge in court.

References

External links
Official biographical sketch in Parliament of India website

India MPs 2019–present
Lok Sabha members from Madhya Pradesh
Living people
Bharatiya Janata Party politicians from Madhya Pradesh
People from Dewas
People from Dewas district
1984 births